The 2017 Belk Bowl was a postseason college football bowl game played at Bank of America Stadium in Charlotte, North Carolina on December 29, 2017. The game was the 16th edition of the Belk Bowl and featured the Wake Forest Demon Deacons of the Atlantic Coast Conference and the Texas A&M Aggies of the Southeastern Conference. It was one of the 2017–18 bowl games concluding the 2017 FBS football season. The game was sponsored by department store chain Belk.

Teams

Wake Forest

The Wake Forest Demon Deacons finished the 2017 regular season with a 7–5 record. The game was the team's second appearance in the bowl; they made their first appearance in 2007, when the game was known as the Meineke Car Care Bowl.

Texas A&M

The Texas A&M Aggies finished the 2017 regular season with a 7–5 record. The game was the team's first appearance in the bowl.

Game summary

Scoring summary

Statistics

References

2017–18 NCAA football bowl games
Duke's Mayo Bowl
Texas A&M Aggies football bowl games
Wake Forest Demon Deacons football bowl games
Belk Bowl
Belk Bowl